West Columbus, sometimes referred to as westside or the West Side, is a neighborhood in Columbus, Ohio, United States.  Unlike other Columbus neighborhoods, it is a broad geographical term used by locals rather than a subdivision or suburb.  West Columbus is defined as the entire southwest side of Columbus, bordered on the north by interstates 70 and 670, within Interstate 71 on the east, and on the south and west by the city limits that reach several miles to the outside of the I-270 outerbelt.  It covers the ZIP Codes 43223, 43204, 43228, and 43222.

Surrounding areas
There are several large, broad neighborhoods in Columbus: West Columbus, South Columbus, East Columbus, the Near East Side, Downtown, North Columbus, the Northeast, the Southeast, and the Northwest. Out of all these areas, West Columbus may be the largest, being rivaled with East Columbus and the Northwest.

Attractions 
 Camp Chase Trail
 Hollywood Casino Columbus, owned and operated by Penn National Gaming
 Battelle Darby Creek Metro Park
 Camp Chase Confederate Cemetery
  Historic National Road
 Columbus Rec and Parks: Big Run Park and Athletic Complex, Westgate Park, WestmoorPark, Holton Park, Glenview Park
 The Hilltop Y
 The Hilltop Swim Club

Politics 
West Columbus is usually a heated political area because it is and has been a suffering area.  Politicians often elect to center certain speeches and topics in West Columbus, especially when the topics are about the economy, poverty, and crime.  These problems were highlighted when the FX television series 30 Days chose to do an episode on poverty and living on the minimum wage.  They thought that this problem related to West Columbus and they taped the show in The Bottoms, or Franklinton, on the city's West Side.

Crime 

The crime rate in West Columbus has been surging. Out of all the neighborhoods listed in the Surrounding Areas Comparison, West Columbus generally ranks in the top three in all crime categories.  Franklinton, a neighborhood in West Columbus, consistently has the highest rate of crime in Columbus on a yearly basis. Homicides, drug trade, and gang violence are common issues encountered across the area. A common theory for the crime on the west side is the poverty that the residents there live in.  It is policed by the Columbus Division of Police, Precincts 10, 19, and 8.  It is also policed by the Franklin Township Police Department and the Franklin County Sheriff's Department.

Neighborhoods 

The following are neighborhoods in West Columbus:
 The Bottoms
 Briggsdale
 Cherry Creek
 Franklinton
 Georgian Heights
 Hardesty Heights
 Hilltop
 Murray Hill
 Riverbend
 Westgate
 Wilshire Heights
 Moneyback
 Lincoln Village

References

Sources 
 J. Testa, The Franklin County Auditor
 The Columbus Dispatch
 The Westside Messenger
 This Week on the West Side
 Images of America: West Columbus, Ohio
 WBNS
 NBC
 NeighborhoodLink

Neighborhoods in Columbus, Ohio